Barry Robert Martin (born 18 July 1950) is an English former first-class cricketer and educator.

Martin was born at Hampton in July 1950. He was educated at Kingston Grammar School, before going up to St Catharine's College, Cambridge. While studying at Cambridge, he played first-class cricket intermittently for Cambridge University Cricket Club from 1971 to 1973, making six appearances. Playing as a medium-fast bowler in the Cambridge side, he took 9 wickets at an average of 44.44, with best figures of 2 for 42. As a tailend batsman, he scored 36 runs with a highest score of 14. In addition to playing cricket for Cambridge, Martin also played field hockey, for which he gained a blue. 

After graduating from Cambridge, he studied for his Postgraduate Certificate in Education at the University of London, before proceeding to Loughborough University where he gained an MBA. From there he began a career in teaching.

References

External links

1950 births
Living people
People from Hampton, London
People educated at Kingston Grammar School
Alumni of St Catharine's College, Cambridge
English cricketers
Cambridge University cricketers
Alumni of the University of London
Alumni of Loughborough University
Schoolteachers from London